Paraphimophis is a genus of snake in the family Colubridae  that contains the sole species Paraphimophis rusticus. It is commonly known as the Culebra.

It is found in South America.

References 

Dipsadinae
Monotypic snake genera
Reptiles described in 1878
Snakes of South America
Reptiles of Argentina
Reptiles of Brazil
Reptiles of Uruguay
Taxa named by Edward Drinker Cope